Chituru Ali (born 6 April 1999) is an Italian sprinter finalist in the 100 m at the 2022 European Athletics Championships.

Career
On 18 June 2022 in Madrid, establishing his personal best 10.15 in the 100 metres, he became the 9th Italian athlete in the all-time top lists and 12th in the European 2022 top lists.

Personal life
Born in Italy, Ali is of Ghanaian descent from his father and Nigerian from his mother. He was raised by Mottin family in Albate.

Personal bests
Outdoor
100 metres – 10.12	(+0.3 m/s, Munich 2022)
200 metres – 20.64	(-0.3 m/s, Grosseto 2022)
Indoor
60 metres – 6.61 (Ancona 2022)

Achievements

See also
 Italian all-time lists - 100 m

Notes

References

External links
 

1999 births
Living people
Italian male sprinters
Italian people of Ghanaian descent
Italian people of Nigerian descent
Athletics competitors of Fiamme Gialle
20th-century Italian people
21st-century Italian people